Andre Wyss is a professor of Paleontology at the University of California, Santa Barbara. He is best known for his contributions in the field of evolution, especially in small mammals of South America and Africa.

External links
Andre Wyss home page at University of California

Year of birth missing (living people)
Living people
American paleontologists
University of California, Santa Barbara faculty
Place of birth missing (living people)